The 1910 Vanderbilt Commodores football team represented Vanderbilt University in the sport of American football during 1910 college football season. In Dan McGugin's 7th year as head coach, the Commodores as members of the Southern Intercollegiate Athletic Association (SIAA) compiled an 8–0–1 record (5–0 SIAA) and outscored their opponents 165 to 8, winning a conference championship.

The only blemish on Vanderbilt's record was a scoreless tie with defending national champion Yale, the first time Yale had been held scoreless at home, and the South's first great showing against an Eastern power. James Howell's computer rating system retroactively named Vanderbilt a national champion.

The team was led by lineman Will Metzger, and piloted in the backfield by  quarterback Ray Morrison.  Metzger was selected third-team All-American by Walter Camp, the third player from the South ever to receive such and honor.

Before the season
Former Vanderbilt player Bob Blake received a law degree and returned to Vanderbilt for one season as an assistant for head coach Dan McGugin. The team's captain was Bill Neely, the older brother of  Jess Neely. Newcomers on the line were the Brown brothers from Gallatin, guard Charles and tackle Tom.

In 1910, football used a one-platoon system, with players featuring on both offense, defense, and special teams.  Also, the field was 110 yards in length, touchdowns were 5 points, and field goals earned 4 points. The team that scored a touchdown had the option to kickoff or receive.

Schedule

Season summary

Mooney
Vanderbilt opened the season on September 24 with a defeat of Mooney School 34–0. Ray Morrison and Bill Neely starred in the backfield.  Despite the excessive heat, newcomers Kent Morrison, Enoch Brown, and Hugh Morgan played well.

The starting lineup was E. Brown (left end), Stegall (left tackle), Metzger (left guard), Morgan (center), Ridgeway (right guard), Freeland (right tackle), Covington (right end), Morrison (quarterback), Neely (left halfback), Williams (right halfback), Robbins (fullback).

Rose Polytechnic
Vanderbilt won over Rose Polytechnic 23–0. Morrison and Neely again starred in the swift backfield. Ted Ross re-injured his knee. Taking Ross's place in the line was Tom Brown.

The starting lineup was E. Brown (left end), Freeland (left tackle), Metzger (left guard), Morgan (center), Ross (right guard), Brown (right tackle), Stewart (right end), Morrison (quarterback), K. Morrison (left halfback), Neely (right halfback), Williams (fullback).

Castle Heights
In the third week of play, the Commodores beat Castle Heights Military Academy 14–0. The contest was billed as practice for the upcoming game with Tennessee. The low score was a bit of a let down.

Tennessee

Sources:

Vanderbilt then won a tough match 18–0 over the Tennessee Volunteers. After a blocked punt, Vanderbilt's Bo Williams went across for the game's first touchdown. The second score came when Neely went around right-end for 15 yards and a touchdown.  Neely had another touchdown in the fourth quarter, running 25 yards. Several fights between players nearly broke out during the game.

The starting lineup was Anderson (left end), T. Brown (left tackle), Metzger (left guard), Morgan (center),  Steagal (right guard), Freeland (right tackle), E. Brown (right end), Robins (quarterback), K. Morrison (left halfback), Neely (right halfback), Williams (fullback).

Yale

Sources:

October 22 brought the highlight of the year: a scoreless tie with the defending national champion, coach Ted Coy's  Yale Bulldogs. It was the first time Yale had been held scoreless at home, and the south's first great showing against an Eastern power.

The game was played in a pouring rain. One account reads "Four times brilliant rushes around end by Capt. Neely brought the ball well into Yale territory, only to be lost because of penalties against the visitors. Vanderbilt did not substitute a single player."

Neely, recalling the game said "The score tells the story a good deal better than I can. All I want to say is that I never saw a football team fight any harder at every point that Vanderbilt fought today – line, ends, and backfield. We went in to give Yale the best we had and I think we about did it."

The starting lineup was Stewart (left end), Freeland (left tackle), F. Brown (left guard), Morgan (center), Metzger (right guard), Noel (right tackle), E. Brown (right end), R. Morrison (quarterback), Neely (left halfback), . Morrison (right halfback), Williams (fullback).

Mississippi

Sources:

Vanderbilt won a close game over Mississippi 9–2. Late in the first quarter, Ray Morrison ran 90 yards for Vanderbilt's touchdown on a punt return. On the ensuing drive, Neely set up to punt, and the ball got away from him. Attempting to recover it, he booted the ball behind his own goal line, netting a safety for Mississippi. Neely later made a 22-yard field goal.  John Heisman was field judge, and McGugin did not want to show too much, playing Heisman's Georgia Tech in two weeks.

The starting lineup was Stewart (left end), T. Brown (left tackle), Brown (left guard), Morgan (center), Metzger (right guard), Freeland (right tackle), E. Brown (right end), Morrison (quarterback), Neely (left halfback), K. Morrison (right halfback), Williams (fullback).

Louisiana State

Sources:

The Commodores overwhelmed the Louisiana State Tigers 22–0. Vanderbilt's first score came on a 12-yard Kent Morrison run.  He also scored the second touchdown.  Neely made the third score, and the last was from an Enoch Brown run of 60 yards. Subs were sent in by game's end.

The starting lineup was Stewart (left end), T. Brown (left tackle), Brown (left guard), Morgan (center), Metzger (right guard), Freeland (right tackle), E. Brown (right end), Morrison (quarterback), Neely (left halfback), K. Morrison (right halfback), Martin (fullback).

Georgia Tech

Sources:

Vanderbilt beat Heisman's Georgia Tech 22–0. Sewanee's coach Harris Cope was at the game, and again McGugin took to conventional football, resulting in a scoreless first half.

The first score came on a pass from Bill Neely to Enoch Brown. Two minutes later, Ray Morrison got away for another touchdown, and the game opened up from there. Morrison was considered the game's star. After an illegal forward pass, Vanderbilt had another touchdown (Bradley Walker's officiating drew criticism throughout).  The last score came after a 25-yard run from Neely and was scored by a dodging Morrison.

The starting lineup was Stewart (left end), Freeland (left tackle), Metzger (left guard), Morgan (center), Stegall (right guard), T. Brown (right tackle), E. Brown (right end), Morrison (quarterback), K. Morrison (left halfback), Neely (right halfback), Williams (fullback).

Sewanee
The Commodores defeated the Sewanee Tigers 23–6. By the second quarter, Sewanee's defense was "completely dismantled" by Vanderbilt's rushing attack. Sewanee had one first down all game – an 85-yard run by Aubrey Lanier.

The starting lineup was Stewart (left end), T. Brown (left tackle), Stegall (left guard), Morgan (center), Metzger (right guard), Freeland (right tackle), E. Brown (right end), Morrison (quarterback), K. Morrison (left halfback), Neely (right halfback), Williams (fullback).

Postseason

Morrison, Metzger, Freeland, and Neely made composite All-Southern. Metzger was selected third-team All-American by Walter Camp, the third player from the South ever to receive such an honor.

Legacy
Both Metzger and Morrison were selected for an Associated Press Southeast Area All-Time football team 1869–1919 era.

Personnel

Depth chart
The following chart provides a visual depiction of Vanderbilt's lineup during the 1910 season with games started at the position reflected in parenthesis. The chart mimics a short punt formation while on offense, with the quarterback under center.

Notes

References

Bibliography
 

Vanderbilt
Vanderbilt Commodores football seasons
College football undefeated seasons
Vanderbilt Commodores football